In molecular biology, Smith-Magenis syndrome chromosome region, candidate 2 (non-protein coding), also known as SMCR2 is a long non-coding RNA. In humans, it is found in a  region of chromosome 17 that is commonly deleted in Smith–Magenis syndrome.

See also
 Long non-coding RNA

References

Non-coding RNA